Jeffrey J. Funke (born April 15, 1969) is an American associate justice of the Nebraska Supreme Court.

Biography
Funke received his undergraduate degree from the University of Nebraska-Lincoln in 1991 and his Juris Doctor from the University of Nebraska College of Law in 1994.

After graduating law school Funke worked in private practice, served as a county attorney and as a deputy public defender.

State court service
Funke served as a county court judge from 2007 to 2013 in Otoe and Sarpy Counties, and as a district court judge in Otoe and Cass Counties from 2013 to 2016. He was appointed county court judge in 2007 and district court judge in 2013 by former Governor Dave Heineman.

Nebraska Supreme Court service
Funke was one of seven applicants who sought the open seat on the Supreme Court. He was appointed to the Supreme Court on June 15, 2016, by Governor Pete Ricketts to succeed Justice William M. Connolly, who retired effective August 1, 2016. At the time of his appointment, he was the Court's youngest jurist.

References

External links
 Official Biography on Nebraska Supreme Court website
 

1969 births
Living people
Public defenders
Justices of the Nebraska Supreme Court
University of Nebraska–Lincoln alumni
University of Nebraska College of Law alumni
20th-century American lawyers
21st-century American judges